Jasmine BlackwaterNygren (née Blackwater; born 1995/1996) is an American politician who has served as the First Lady of Navajo Nation since 2023. She also served as a member of the Arizona House of Representatives from the 7th legislative district from 2021 to 2023, when she was the youngest lawmaker in Arizona.

Political career
Blackwater-Nygren was appointed to Arizona's 7th legislative district after Democrat Arlando Teller resigned to take a position in the United States Department of Transportation. She did not run for election in 2022.

Personal life
Blackwater-Nygren is a member of the Navajo Nation and is married to Buu Nygren, who became President of the Navajo Nation on January 10, 2023.

References

1990s births
21st-century American women politicians
21st-century American politicians
21st-century Native American women
21st-century Native Americans
First ladies of the Navajo Nation
Living people
Democratic Party members of the Arizona House of Representatives
Native American state legislators in Arizona
Native American women in politics
Sandra Day O'Connor College of Law alumni
Stanford University alumni
Women state legislators in Arizona